Edward Frederick (E. F.) Knight (23 April 1852 – 3 July 1925) was an English barrister, soldier, journalist, and author of 20 books, many based on his dispatches as a war correspondent.

Biography

Knight was born in England, and travelled with his family to British India at an early age. He was educated at Westminster School and Caius College, Cambridge, where he pursued legal studies. He was called to the Bar from Lincoln's Inn in 1879. However, he abandoned the legal profession to pursue a career in journalism instead, writing primarily for the Morning Post and The Times.

During the Franco-Prussian War of 1870, while living in France at his father's house in Honfleur he attempted to enlist with the French Army near Rouen, but was turned down as he was an alien.  In 1878, he explored Albania and Montenegro, returning to the Balkans during the Russo-Turkish War.

In 1889 Knight sailed to the island of Trindade off the coast of Brazil in a 64-foot cutter named the Alerte.  He was in search of treasure. (He had previously visited the island in his first boat the Falcon I). He wrote the book The Cruise of the Alerte about his journey with detailed descriptions of Trindade. He was an influence on children's author Arthur Ransome who used Knight's book Sailing to teach himself how to sail; and in the Swallows and Amazons series as a resource for his fictional characters, who often refer to Knight on Sailing. Ransome also used Knight's descriptions of Trindade as a model for his fictional Crab Island in the book Peter Duck. Erskine Childers was another author who was influenced by Knight's writing. He used The 'Falcon' in the Baltic as material for his book The Riddle of the Sands.

During 1890, Knight visited Kashmir and went travelling in the Himalayas to gather material for his book Where Three Empires Meet.  He visited Ladakh and went on to Gilgit. He arrived in Gilgit in time to become involved in the 1891 British campaign against the minor states of Hunza and Nagar, led by the Resident, Col. Algernon Durand. He was temporarily appointed an officer in charge of some native troops, and acted as a correspondent for The Times.

Knight subsequently covered Kitchener's Soudan Expedition, the Spanish–American War in Cuba, the French expedition against Madagascar, the Anglo-Boer War. He was severely wounded in South Africa during the Battle of Belmont, resulting in the amputation of his right arm.

In 1894 he had visited the new territory of Rhodesia just as Cecil Rhodes was conquering Matabeleland in south-western Rhodesia and his assessment of the country, presented in a series of articles written for The Times, later appeared in book form under the title of Rhodesia of Today.

From 1904–1905, he covered the Russo-Japanese War, as a reporter embedded within the Imperial Japanese Army. He was mistakenly reported as killed in action by The New York Times, which ran his obituary on 4 June 1904.

Knight died in 1925 after a long retirement.

Selected works
 1880 – Albania
 1884 – The Cruise of the Falcon: A voyage to South America in a 30-ton yacht (2 volumes)
 1885 – The Threatening Eye
 1889 – The Cruise of the 'Alerte'
 1889 – The "Falcon" on the Baltic. A Coasting Voyage from Hammersmith to Copenhagen in a Three-ton Yacht
 1889 – Sailing (The All-England Series)
 1893 – Where Three Empires Meet
 1897 – Letters from the Sudan
 1898 – A Desperate Voyage
 1895 –- Rhodesia of Today
 1901 –- 'Small Boat Sailing 1909 – The Awakening of Turkey: A History of the Turkish Revolution 1910 –- Knots and Tackles 1919 – The Harwich Naval Forces – Their Part in the Great War''
 1923 – Reminiscences: The Wanderings of a Yachtsman and War Correspondent

Notes

References

 Bullard, Frederic Lauriston. (1914).  Famous War Correspondents. Boston: Little, Brown.   OCLC 2135019
 Roth, Mitchel P. and James Stuart Olson. (1997).  Historical Dictionary of War Journalism. Westport, Connecticut: Greenwood Publishing Group. 
 Wilson-Latham, Robert. (1979).  From Our Special Correspondent: Victorian War Correspondents and Their Campaigns. London: Hodder and Stoughton.

External links
 
 
 
Rhodesia of Today. 
 

English travel writers
English war correspondents
1852 births
1925 deaths
Alumni of Gonville and Caius College, Cambridge
War correspondents of the Russo-Japanese War
English amputees
19th-century English non-fiction writers
20th-century English non-fiction writers
19th-century English lawyers